Dominik Simon (born 8 August 1994) is a Czech professional ice hockey forward currently under contract with HC Sparta Praha of the Czech Extraliga (ELH). He was selected by the Pittsburgh Penguins, 137th overall, in the 2015 NHL Entry Draft.

Playing career

Early career
Simon played in the 2007 Quebec International Pee-Wee Hockey Tournament with a youth team from Chomutov. He made his Czech Extraliga debut for HC Sparta Praha during the 2012–13 season. He was selected by Rimouski Océanic in the 2013 CHL Import Draft, however he did not report to Rimouski, instead staying with Sparta Praha for the 2013–14 season.

In May 2014, Simon signed with HC Plzeň.

After a breakout 2014–15 season with HC Plzeň in the Czech Extraliga, Simon was drafted by the Pittsburgh Penguins 137th overall in the 2015 NHL Entry Draft.

NHL

Pittsburgh Penguins
Simon was signed by the Penguins to a three-year, entry-level contract on 15 July 2015. He began the 2015–16 season playing for the Penguins' American Hockey League (AHL) affiliate, the Wilkes-Barre/Scranton Penguins. He made his NHL debut on 13 March 2016, where he earned his first NHL assist in a 5–3 win against the New York Rangers. After playing three games in the NHL, he was reassigned to the AHL.

On 6 April 2017, Simon was recalled from Wilkes-Barre/Scranton.

Simon was recalled again from the Wilkes-Barre/Scranton Penguins on 8 December 2017, as Greg McKegg was reassigned. Simon scored his first NHL goal on 14 January 2018 in a game against the New York Rangers. Simon was injured in a game against the Philadelphia Flyers on 7 March 2018. He returned to the lineup on 23 March 2018 for a game against the New Jersey Devils. Simon made his playoff debut on 18 April 2018, where he also recorded his first playoff point in a 5–0 win over Philadelphia.

In October 2018, Simon made the Pittsburgh opening-night roster for the 2018–19 NHL season. Simon was injured on 4 December 2018, suffering a lower-body injury during a game against the Colorado Avalanche. He returned to the line-up on 20 December after missing eight games.

Following his fifth season within the Penguins organization in 2019–20, due to salary cap considerations, Simon was not tendered a qualifying offer as a restricted free agent and was released to free agency on 5 October 2020. On 22 October 2020, Simon agreed to join the Calgary Flames by signing a one-year, $700,000 contract. In the pandemic delayed  season, Simon struggled to find a role within the Flames, going scoreless in 11 games before he was re-assigned to AHL affiliate, the Stockton Heat.

At the conclusion of his contract with the Flames, on 28 July 2021 Simon returned to the Pittsburgh Penguins as a free agent on a one-year, two-way deal.

Anaheim Ducks
On 21 March 2022, Simon was traded by Pittsburgh along with Zach Aston-Reese to the Anaheim Ducks in exchange for Rickard Rakell.

Return to Sparta Praha
At the conclusion of his contract with the Ducks, Simon a free agent opted to return to Czechia and signed a two-year contract with his original club, HC Sparta Praha of the ELH, on 10 September 2022.

International play

Simon made his Czech Republic national team senior debut when he participated at the 2015 IIHF World Championship. He also represented the Czech Republic at the 2019 IIHF World Championship and the 2022 IIHF World Championship, where he won a bronze medal.

Career statistics

Regular season and playoffs

International

References

External links
 

1994 births
Living people
Anaheim Ducks players
Calgary Flames players
Czech expatriate ice hockey players in the United States
Czech ice hockey forwards
Pittsburgh Penguins draft picks
Pittsburgh Penguins players
HC Plzeň players
HC Sparta Praha players
Ice hockey people from Prague
Stockton Heat players
Wilkes-Barre/Scranton Penguins players
Czech expatriate ice hockey players in Canada